Guzmania amplectens is a plant species in the genus Guzmania. This species is native to Colombia and Ecuador.

References

amplectens
Flora of Colombia
Plants described in 1949
Flora of Ecuador